Rubén Aguilar Jiménez (born 10 March 1943) is a Mexican politician from the Labor Party.He as  served as Deputy of the LII and LX Legislatures of the Mexican Congress representing Chihuahua (state).

References

1943 births
Living people
Politicians from Chihuahua (state)
Labor Party (Mexico) politicians
21st-century Mexican politicians
People from Ojinaga, Chihuahua
Members of the Congress of Chihuahua
Autonomous University of Chihuahua alumni
20th-century Mexican politicians
Deputies of the LX Legislature of Mexico
Members of the Chamber of Deputies (Mexico) for Chihuahua (state)